Puerto Rico is a small town in Andrés Ibáñez Province, Andrés Ibáñez Province, Bolivia, just south of the town of El Torno.

References

Populated places in Santa Cruz Department (Bolivia)